Steve Cannon (April 10, 1935 – July 7, 2019) was an American writer and the founder of the cultural organization A Gathering of the Tribes. He was born in New Orleans, Louisiana, and moved to New York City in 1962.

Early life 

Steve Cannon was born in New Orleans, Louisiana, on April 10, 1935, and was named Calvin Stanley Cannon.  Arriving in the middle of the Great Depression, the eighth child of Eugene Charles Cannon (September 1, 1900–June ? 1992) and Lillie Victoria St Cyr Cannon (August 4, 1905 – July 1, 1935), he did not suffer financial deprivation because Eugene was a letter carrier, which was an excellent job for a black man in those days. Eugene was later also ordained a Baptist minister. Lillie had worked at James Lewis Elementary School before marrying, and at that time married women could not teach school. 
Calvin/Steve's mother, Lillie, died on July 1, 1935, from complications related to giving birth to him.1 After her death, Eugene's mother Patsy Payne Cannon and Eugene's sister, Rose Cannon, moved into the family home at 3741 Willow Street to help care for Calvin and his seven older siblings: Yvonne, Doris, Eugene, Jr., Naomi, Esther, Beverly, and Walter.

As a child, Calvin had a very serious speech impediment, ans until he was eight or nine years old, his speech was unintelligible, sounding like gibberish. It was almost impossible to understand him and the neighborhood children would tease him to remove the fat from under his tongue. Frustrated, he mostly refused to speak. His brother Walter, who was 18 months older, became his translator. When Calvin/Steve was four, his father registered him at Thomy Lafon Elementary School but in less than a week he was sent home because the teacher said he was unable to converse with her or any of his classmates. The problem was solved when his father arranged to have Walter put in class with him. Even then, Calvin/Steve was a brilliant student; able to read and write and complete any math problems. He somehow cured himself and began to speak as distinctly as everyone else. His extensive vocabulary surprised his elders. 
Walter was very protective of Calvin/Steve. On one occasion, Calvin/Steve grabbed some forbidden cookies and his grandmother was going to spank him but Walter, not yet four, grabbed his grandmother's arm saying: "You can’t spank him. He's just a little boy and he doesn't even have a mother." He did not receive a spanking on that day or any other day.

In June, 1941, Eugene married Theresa Elvira Boyd, also a school teacher. Eugene's mother and sister insisted that Lillie, Calvin/Steve's mother, had instructed that they raise Walter and Calvin/Steve. Eugene and Theresa relented. Walter and Calvin/Steve remained with their grandmother. Their father's new union brought them five more siblings: Robert, Edward, Evelyn, Harold Lloyd and Patsy.

Calvin/Steve was adventurous. One summer day he went along with some neighborhood boys, got into an old skift, and rode down the New Basin Canal. Unknown to the boys, the boat had a leak and began to sink. Somehow they got to land but on the other side of the canal, with no sense of how to get home. A police officer gave them a ride home.

Eugene paid for Calvin/Steve to attend Gilbert Academy, the premier preparatory school for African-American high-school students in New Orleans. After it closed in 1949, he continued at McDonogh 35, the public college preparatory high school for African Americans.

After serving a stint in the Air Force, Calvin/Steve opted to sign up with the Army, so he could serve as a paratrooper. He resided in London, England, for a few years and then returned to New Orleans. Although he enjoyed the food and the music scene in his hometown, he felt stifled. He wanted to be a writer and decided that New Orleans was not the place for him to work. While he was in the armed forces, some folks began to call him Steve, after the cartoon character in the Steve Canyon adventure comic strip by writer-artist Milton Caniff. Calvin/Steve began to introduce himself as Steve, though he never legally changed his name.

Before he left New Orleans, Steve bought his first and only car. On a trip driving back from Baton Rouge, with a beautiful young cousin, he drove into a large pole, completely destroying the car. Although Steve had only minor injuries, his young cousin was badly injured and left with a large scar on one side of her face. Steve was very upset with himself and determined never to drive a car again.

In 1962, Calvin/Steve moved to New York City and became a serious part of that city's literary scene.

Career 
During the civil rights era, he was a member of the Society of Umbra, a collective of Black writers.

Cannon taught humanities at Medgar Evers College, helping to integrate the public school system in New York City.

In 1969, Cannon penned the novel Groove, Bang, and Jive Around, which author Ishmael Reed called the precursor to rap and author Darius James called in the New York Press, "an underground classic of such legendary stature that New York's black cognoscenti have transformed the work into an urban myth."

Cannon, along with Joe Johnson and Ishmael Reed, began an independent publishing house that focused on multicultural literature in the 1970s called Reed, Cannon and Johnson. In 1973 he also collaborated with Reed to interview the first Black sci-fi writer, George S. Schuyler, for Yardbird II, Reed's own publication.

Cannon met artist David Hammons on a park bench in the 1970s and they became friends. The two collaborated on certain works, including Invisible Paintings, where Hammons traced Cannon's painting collection with pencil and then removed the physical works. Hammons once bottled Cannon's voice speaking poems. Cannon wrote poems about Hammons' work and made public appearances for him.

Cannon was a mentor to many writers, including Eileen Myles, Norman Ohler, and Paul Beatty. In 2013 he was featured with curator Lydia Y. Nichols in an artist talk about Black bodies and migration for Curator's International.

A Gathering of Tribes 
In 1990, Cannon was visiting the Nuyorican Poet's Cafe with Hammons when he was inspired to create A Gathering of the Tribes first as a literary magazine to document the vibrant culture that was happening in the Lower East Side. The first issue was published with less than 1000 copies in 1991 on a Xerox machine.

By 1993, Tribes quickly grew into a salon and non-profit multi-cultural interdisciplinary arts organization run from his home in the New York City borough of Manhattan's East Village neighborhood. Cannon wanted it to be a multicultural, multigenerational space for both local and traveling art lovers. The collective also hosted a gallery and performance space where numerous exhibitions and concerts have taken place, supporting and inspiring many notable artists and musicians such as the Sun Ra Arkestra (1995), David Henderson, Chavisa Woods, John Farris, Bob Holman, Ishmael Reed, Billy Bang, Diane Burns, Max Blagg, and David Hammons.

One of Cannon's exhibitions at Tribes Gallery that he titled Exquisite Poop was inspired by his relationship with visual art as a blind person. A painter included in the exhibition would describe a piece to participating writers, who would then describe the painting for a different painter who would in turn paint it.

In April 2014, both the organization and Cannon were forced to relocate and the gallery permanently shut when the occupancy agreement they had with the woman to whom the building had previously been sold, Lorraine Zhang, ended. Simultaneously, a wall that retained some of an art-piece by David Hammons (which had previously been sold to an art collector after having been reproduced and the originality of the object transferred) was removed and relocated by the organization, being replaced by another minus the pedigree adornment.

Tribes magazine began publishing online and Cannon published an anthology in hard copy in 2017.

Personal life
Cannon went completely blind in 1989 from glaucoma.

Death and memorials
Cannon died on July 7, 2019, from sepsis at an assisted nursing facility in New York City at the age of 84.

Cannon was memorialized at three events following his death.  First there was a tribute reading organized by Bob Holman and Chavisa Woods at the Bowery Poetry Club the week after his death, at which many of his contemporaries, colleagues, and admirers offered remembrances. Among those who spoke and or performed were: Katherine Arnoldi, Janine Cirincione, Patricia Spears Jones, Valery Oisteanu, Penny Arcade, Ron Kolm,  Nina Kuo, William Parker, and Daniel Carter, Cannon's sister Evelyn Cannon, his daughter Melanie Best, Nancy Mercado, Steve Dalachinsky, Mike Tyler, and Urayoán Noel, as well as Holman and Woods. For the second gathering held on September 6, 2019, at the Flamboyan Theater at the Clemente Arts for Art, A Gathering of the Tribes came together to offer a memorial program featuring poetry in music, including sendoffs from the Sun Ra Arkestra, Tracie Morris with Elliott Sharp and Graham Haynes, Anne Waldman, and Edwin Torres. Thirdly, a "Celebration of Life" was held by the Poetry Project at St. Mark's Church in-the-Bowery on Sunday, November 3, 2019, which was preceded by a Jazz Funeral parade led by the Rebirth Jazz Band flown in from Cannon's hometown of New Orleans beginning at his longtime home at 285 East 3rd street to the place of celebration.  Among those offering praise both in words and in music for Cannon at this event were Matthew Shipp, Paul Beatty, and Victor Hernandez Cruz.

Bibliography

References

External links
A Gathering of the Tribes magazine

1935 births
2019 deaths
20th-century African-American people
21st-century African-American people
African-American male writers
African-American novelists
African-American poets
American male novelists
Novelists from Louisiana
People from the East Village, Manhattan
Poets from New York (state)
Writers from New Orleans